The 1967 Danish 1st Division season was the 22nd season of the Danish 1st Division league championship, governed by the Danish Football Association.

It was contested by 12 teams, and Akademisk Boldklub won the championship.

Table

Results

References
Denmark - List of final tables (RSSSF)

Danish 1st Division seasons
Dan
Dan
1
Top level Danish football league seasons